Tetraphenylphosphonium chloride is the chemical compound with the formula (C6H5)4PCl, abbreviated Ph4PCl or PPh4Cl. Tetraphenylphosphonium and especially tetraphenylarsonium salts were formerly of interest in gravimetric analysis of perchlorate and related oxyanions. This colourless salt is used to generate lipophilic salts from inorganic and organometallic anions. Thus, Ph4P+ is useful as a phase-transfer catalyst, again because it allows inorganic anions to dissolve in organic solvents.

Structure and basic properties
The cation is tetrahedral. PPh4Cl crystallises as the anhydrous salt, which is normal item of commerce, as well as a monohydrate and a dihydrate.

In X-ray crystallography,  salts are of interest as they often crystallise easily. The rigidity of the phenyl groups facilitates packing and elevates the melting point relative to alkyl-based quaternary ammonium salts. Also, since these salts are soluble in organic media, a wide range of solvents can be employed for their crystallisation.

Preparation
PPh4Cl and many analogous compounds can be prepared by the reaction of chlorobenzene with triphenylphosphine catalysed by nickel salts:
PhCl + PPh3 → Ph4PCl

The compound was originally prepared as the corresponding bromide salt (CAS No. 2751-90-8), which in turn was synthesized by passing dry oxygen through the reaction of phenylmagnesium bromide and triphenylphosphine. The synthesis probably proceeds via the reaction of the Grignard reagent with triphenylphosphine oxide.
PhMgBr + Ph3PO → Ph4POMgBr
Ph4POMgBr + HBr → Ph4PBr + "Mg(OH)Br"

Use in synthesis
Tetraphenylphosphonium salts of inorganic or metalloorganic anions are often sought because they are easily crystallized.  They also tend to be soluble in polar organic solvents such as acetonitrile and dimethylformamide.  Examples include the perrhenate (PPh4[ReO4]) and various thiomolybdates.  Complexes of maleonitriledithiolate are also isolated as their PPh4+ salts.

References

Chlorides
Quaternary phosphonium compounds
Phenyl compounds